This is a list of the etymology of street names in the London district of Holborn. Holborn has no formally defined boundaries - those utilised here are: Theobald’s Road to the north, Gray's Inn Road and the City of London boundary to the east, Victoria Embankment/the Thames to the south, and Lancaster Place, the north-west curve of the Aldwych semi-circle, Kingsway/Southampton Row to the west.

Streets in the Hatton Garden sub-district are covered in Hatton Garden#Street name etymologies
 Aldwych – from Old English ‘Ealdwic’ or ‘Aldwic’, meaning ‘old settlement’, given by Anglo-Saxons referring to a Danish settlement here of the 9th century
 Andrews Crosse – after a former Tudor-era inn here of this name
 Arundel Street – after Arundel House which formerly stood on this site
 Bedford Row – from Peter Harpur of Bedford, a local landowner who laid this street out in the early 18th century
 Bell Yard – after the Bell Inn, which stood here in the 16th century
 Bishop’s Court – formerly led to the palace of the Bishop of Chichester, built in the 13th century
 Brownlow Street – after William Brownlow, who built this street in the 17th century; his family had held land in the area since the 16th century
 Carey Street – after Nicholas Carey, who lived in this area or Sir George Carey
 Catton Street – after the 18th century painter Charles Catton who lived nearby
 Chancery Lane – the former site of Edward III’s office of the Master of the Rolls of Chancery
 Chichester Rents – formerly a street of rented houses leading to the palace of Ralph Harris, Bishop of Chichester in the 13th century
 Clare Market – former site of a butcher’s market on land owned by the John Holles, Earl of Clare who lived nearby
 Clement’s Inn, Clement’s Inn Passage and Clement’s Lane – after the nearby St Clement Danes church
 Clerkenwell Road – from a local well ('the clerk's well'), which gave its name to the area and to this district
 Dane Street – from the St Clement Danes church on Aldwych, who own land in the area
 Devereux Court – from the Devereaux family, earls of Essex, who occupied Essex House on this site in Tudor times
 Dog and Duck Yard
 Drake Street – thought to be after an early 18th century builder of this name
 Eagle Street – named after a local inn here in the 18th century
 Essex Street and Little Essex Street – former site of a townhouse belonging to the earls of Essex
 Field Court
 Fisher Street – after Thomas Fisher, a local 16th century landowner
 Fleet Street – after the now covered river Fleet which flowed near here
 French Horn Yard – unknown; the entrance to this yard is now covered by development, and though it still exists between nos. 87 and 90 and High Holborn it is no longer generally accessible to the public 
 Fulwood Place – after Sir George Fulwood, 16th century member of Gray's Inn
 Grange Court – thought to a descriptive name dating from the Middle Ages when this was farmland
 Gray’s Inn Place, Gray's Inn Road and Gray's Inn Square – from Lord Gray of Wilton, owner of a local inn or town house which was later leased to lawyers in the 16th century
 Great Turnstile, Little Turnstile Street and New Turnstile Gate – after turnstiles that stood here in the 17th century
 Greyhound Court – thought to be after a former inn of this name
 Hand Court – thought to be from a former shop sign advertising gloves or a tailors
 High Holborn, Holborn, Holborn Circus and Holborn Place – thought to be from ‘hollow bourne’ i.e. the river Fleet which formerly flowed in a valley near here. The ‘High’ stems from the fact that rode led away from the river to higher ground. Circus is a British term for a road junction.
 Houghton Street – after John Holles, Second Baron Houghton, who built the street in the 1650s
 India Place – after the adjacent Indian High Commission''
 Jockey’s Fields – thought to date from the old custom of the Lord Mayor and retainers on horseback inspecting the nearby conduit on the river Tyburn
 Kingsway – named in honour of Edward VII, reigning king when this road was completed in 1906
 Lamb’s Conduit Passage – after a conduit built by William Lambe in the 16th century to bring clean water from the countryside north of London
 Lancaster Place – former site of the Savoy Palace. It passed into the ownership of the earls of Lancaster in the 13th century, the most famous of which was John of Gaunt, who owned the palace at the times of its destruction in Peasant’s Revolt of 1381
 Lincoln's Inn Fields – after Lincoln’s Inn, the townhouse of the Lacy family, earls of Lincoln, later leased to lawyers in the 14th century
 Maltraver’s Street – built on the site of the former Arundel House; one of the 16th century earls of Arundel was Henry Fitzalan who was also Baron Maltravers
 Melbourne Place – after Melbourne in Australia, as the Australian High Commission in on this site
 Milford Lane – origin unknown, though possibly from a Thames mill located on this site in former times
 Montreal Place – after Montreal in Canada, 
 Newman’s Row – after Arthur Newman, who built the street in the mid-1600s
 New Inn Passage – as this formerly led to the New Inn, one of the Inns of Chancery
 New Square and New Square Passage – named simply as it was new when first built by Henry Serle
 Old North Street – as it leads northwards from Red Lions Square, ‘Old’ so as to contract with New North Street which continues northwards
 Old Buildings and Old Square – gained this name after the building of New Square in 1682
 Portsmouth Street – a house belonging to Louise de Kérouaille, Duchess of Portsmouth, mistress of Charles II, lay on this site
 Portugal Street – named in honour of Charles II’s Portuguese queen Catherine of Braganza, or possibly after the Portuguese embassy which was formerly located here
 Princeton Street – formerly ‘Prince Street’, though after which prince exactly is unknown. It was changed so as to avoid confusion with other Prince Streets.
 Procter Street – after the 19th century poet Bryan Waller Procter, who lived at Red Lion Square
 Raymond Buildings – after Lord Chief Justice Raymond, who was called to the bar at Gray's Inn in 1697
 Red Lion Square and Red Lion Street – from the 17th century Red Lion Inn, now demolished
 Remnant Street – after James Farquharson Remnant, 1st Baron Remnant, lawyer at Lincoln’s Inn and latter MP for Holborn
 River Terrace – presumably as it is a terrace overlooking the river Thames
 Sandland Street
 Sardinia Street – after the embassy of the Kingdom of Sardinia and its associated chapel, formerly located on this site
 Serle Street – after Henry Serle, who built the street in the 1680s
 Sheffield Street
 Southampton Row – Southampton House, home of the earls of Southampton, formerly stood here in the 16th century
 South Square – from its location in the south of Gray's Inn
 Star Yard – after the former Starre Tavern here
 Stone Buildings
 Strand and Strand Lane – from Old English ‘stond’, meaning the edge of a river; the river Thames formerly reached here prior to the building of the Thames Embankment
 Surrey Steps and Surrey Street – built on the site of Arundel House, owned by the Howard family who had a branch holding the earldom of Surrey
 Temple Place – after the nearby Inner Temple and Middle Temple
 Theobald's Road – this road formerly formed part of a route used by Stuart monarchs to their hunting grounds at Theobalds House, Hertfordshire
 Three Cups Yard – named after a local inn of this name in the 18th century
 Tweezer’s Alley
 Twyford Place – after Twyford, Berkshire, home of James Farquharson Remnant, 1st Baron Remnant for whom Remnant Street is named
 Victoria Embankment – after Queen Victoria, reigning queen at the time of the building of the Thames Embankment
 Vere Street - between Clare Market at its eastern end and Duke Street (which, via Prince's Street, itself connected to Drury Lane) at its western end. Demolished around 1900.
 Warwick Court – site of the townhouse of Gray’s Inn lawyer Robert Rich, Baron Rich who was created Earl of Warwick in 1618
 Water Street – formerly ran to the waterline of the Thames, prior to the building of the Thames Embankment
 Whetstone Park – built by William Whetstone in 1636
 Yorkshire Grey Yard – named after a local inn of this name in the 18th century, presumably referring to the breed of horse

References

Streets in the London Borough of Camden
Lists of United Kingdom placename etymology
Holborn
Holborn
England geography-related lists